The Welsh International is an international badminton championship held in Wales since 1928 and is thereby one of the oldest badminton tournaments in the world. The tournament was halted during World War II and until 1956, between 1960 and 1966, and in 1971. It is organised by Welsh Badminton Cymru, the governing body for badminton in Wales.

Past winners

Performances by nation

References

External links
Official Website

 
Badminton tournaments in Wales
1928 establishments in Wales
Recurring sporting events established in 1928